Occasional Coarse Language is a 1998 Australian romantic comedy film about a young woman who loses her boyfriend and job in the same day and tries to get her life back on track. The film's soundtrack features songs by several notable Australian bands including Spiderbait, Jebediah, The Living End and Grinspoon.

Production
Writer-director Brad Hayward was inspired by the success of the film The Brothers McMullen and made the original cut for $40,000. The film was subsequently picked up and distributed by Roadshow Entertainment, which paid for the post-production work.

See also
List of Australian films of 1998

References

External links

Occasional Coarse Language review in Variety

Australian romantic comedy films
1990s English-language films
1990s Australian films